The RUB type carriage stock was a type of steel bodied air conditioned passenger carriage operated by the New South Wales Government Railways from September 1949 until April 2000.

History
In 1943, the New South Wales Government Railways awarded a contract for twenty steel sitting carriages to Waddingtons. These were to be similar to the N type carriages that had been built in 1939 but with the addition of steam heating.

Delays in construction & redesign as Air Conditioned Carriages
Construction of these cars was shelved while wartime restrictions were in place and when the project resumed in 1945, it was decided the carriages should be air-conditioned and the order increased to fifty. Work had already commenced on the underframes when it was decided to lengthen the carriages from  necessitating in the reworking of those already in production. A shortage of steel meant it would not be until 1949 that the first were completed.

The initial fifty cars numbered 2240 to 2290 were eventually built by Commonwealth Engineering, Granville (the successors to Waddingtons) between 1949 and 1952. The completed carriages consisted of seventeen first class cars coded SBS, twenty-five second class cars codes SFS, four second class cars with hostess & staff compartments coded OFS & four first class cars with hostess & staff compartments coded OBS. In 1949, Commonwealth Engineering was awarded a further contract for eight buffet cars coded RS and nine power vans coded PHS. The early carriages were fitted out by Commonwealth Engineering, later examples being completed at Eveleigh Carriage Workshops.

In June 1965, one additional buffet carriage was built at Eveleigh Carriage Workshops.

Into service
The first set operated a trial to Moss Vale on 10 August 1949 before being unveiled to the press on 13 September 1949.

The first entered service in September 1949 on the Riverina Express followed by the Northern Tablelands Express (April 1951), Central West Express (1952) and the North Coast Daylight Express (1953). In September 1956, the two off the Central West Express were reallocated to the Melbourne Daylight Express.

Formation
In 1951, the formation of the eight RUB sets from the Sydney end were:

The formation of the sets were soon altered as by early 1952 RUB set 143 was recorded as consisting of.

Breaking up of fixed RUB Sets
From the 1970s, they ceased to operate in fixed sets and at various times were used on the Brisbane Limited, Canberra Express, Gold Coast Motorail, Indian Pacific (to Broken Hill), North Coast Overnight Express, The Alice and Sydney/Melbourne Express in company with HUB, stainless steel sleeper and non air-conditioned stock.

Withdrawal
Many were withdrawn as a number of locomotive hauled services ceased in the early 1990s. Those remaining were used on CountryLink's Canberra Express and Grafton Express and CityRail services to Bomaderry and Goulburn before being replaced by Endeavour railcars from 1994.

Most were auctioned in August 1994 with the State Rail Authority retaining nine.

Four were returned to service in March 1996 services to operate new services to Broken Hill and Griffith. These were replaced by Xplorers in April 2000. Some have been placed on RailCorp's heritage register.

Carriage types

SBS, TBS TDS, SDS & SBZ First Class Cars & SBH First Class with Luggage Compartment
As built the first 16 carriages (2240 - 2256) were given the code SBS and could seat 31 passengers in 2 and 1 rotating and inclining seats. A further 6 could be seated in a compartment next to the ladies toilet. During the 1960s ten cars were converted to 2 and 2 seats which increased the seating to 48. In 1979 to differentiate between the different seating capacities the remaining lower capacity SBS carriages were recoded TBS. During the mid-1980s these TBS carriages were converted to day-night seating which altered the seating capacity to 48, these cars were then recoded TDS.

Four SBS carriages were converted to day-night cars (2245, 2252, 2255 & 2256) and recoded SDS.

During the early 1980s 3 SBS cars (2241, 2248 & 2249) had their compartment section altered to a storeroom for the dining cars on the Gold Coast Motorail. This reduced the seating capacity to 42, with these cars recoded SBZ. These three cars were further rebuilt between 1987 and 1989 and had new toilets fitted at one end, with the other end being rebuilt into a large luggage area with a guard's compartment, these cars then had a seating capacity of 36 and were given the code SBH.

OFS, OBS, ODS & ODL Staff & Sitting Cars & RDS Buffet/Sitting Car
Four second class sitting cars coded OFS with a seating capacity of 41 with 2 and 2 seating and a staff and a hostess compartment were originally constructed & numbered 2257 to 2260. Four first class sitting cars were also constructed and coded OBS numbered 2261 to 2264 and had a seating capacity of 28 with 2 and 1 seating and a staff and a hostess compartment.

During the late 1970s 2257, 2260, 2261 & 2263 were converted to day-night seating with a passenger capacity of 42. As part of this conversion the toilets at the men's end were removed & replaced by four small cubicles, two for each sex. The ladies toilet, staff & hostess compartments were removed to allow for the main saloon to be lengthened. A new staff compartment was installed in the remaining space. These converted cars were recoded ODS. Second class sitting car SFS 2267 was also converted to an ODS car as well during 1977.

In 1985 2262 & 2264 were rebuilt with day-night seating with a capacity of 34 passengers and recoded ODL.

In 1989 ODS 2263 was rebuilt with a buffet & serving counter and a capacity of 30 passengers, being recoded RDS.

SFS & SFE Second Class Cars, SFR Second Class/Buffet Storage & SDS, BDS, NDS & SDZ Day-Nighter Cars
Twenty five second class cars numbered 2265 to 2289 were originally constructed and coded SFS, these cars had a seating capacity of 49 in the main saloon & 8 in a compartment.

In 1956 SFS 2267 & 2268 had their eight-seat compartment stripped and rebuilt for beverage storage and were recoded SFR. In 1960 these two cars had their storage compartments removed and their saloons lengthened, which gave them a capacity of 57 passengers in the main saloon, they were also recoded back to SFS. In 1963 the eight seat compartment of SFS 2279 & 2281 was altered and the cars were recoded SFR and had a capacity of 49 passengers. These cars were coupled next to the RS buffet cars on the Intercapital Daylight to give increased space for food preparation & take away snacks. In 1981 these 2 cars were taken out of service, with 2279 being converted to an SDS and 2281 was later condemned in 1983.

During the mid-1970s to early 1980s 10 SFS cars were converted to day-night cars (Nos.2271,2272,2273,2276,2278,2280,2284,2287,2288 & 2289). This conversion involved the removal of the 8 seat compartment which increased the seating capacity to 60, these cars were recoded SDS. In 1985 Nos.2287 and 2289 were converted by fitting of an interior partition to provide separate smoking & non-smoking sections, these 2 cars were recoded SDZ.

In 1985-86 five SFS cars (Nos.2269,2282,2283,2285 & 2286) were refurbished, as part of this refurbishment the old saloon seating and the compartment were removed and replaced by new day-night seating. The new seating arrangements had a capacity of 48 and these cars were recoded BDS. These 5 cars were refurbished again in 1988-89 with the removal of the toilets at one end and were fitted with additional day-night seating which then gave them a capacity of 64 passengers. These 5 cars were then recoded to NDS.

In 1988-89 SFS 2265 & 2274 were refurbished, this involved the stripping of the saloon & the toilets at one end, economy turnover seating was retained with a capacity of 72 passengers, these cars were recoded SFE.

RS & ABS Buffet Diner Cars
Eight buffet cars coded RS were originally constructed by Commonwealth Engineering and numbered 2299 to 2306. A ninth car numbered 1962 was constructed at Eveleigh Carriage Workshops in 1965. The interior design of these buffet cars was based on the buffet cars built by Victorian Railways in 1938-39. Instead of tables and chairs with a centre aisle they were fitted with a long counter and 27 stools that ran the length of most of the car. Food preparation was mostly carried out behind the counter, along with a small kitchen at one end of the car.

In 1973 to handle the heavy bookings on the Intercapital Daylight two of the RS cars (2299 & 2306) were rebuilt as ABS dining cars. These cars were fitted with fixed tables and loose 48 seats, the separate kitchen was also enlarged and rebuilt. Due to objections by the Victorian Railways these rebuilt cars were not used on their intended service but on the Gold Coast Motorail instead. During 1975-76 a further four were rebuilt as ABS type cars (2300, 2302, 2303 & 2305) to provide dining car service on the Brisbane Limited and North Coast Daylight Express. In 1985 RS 2304 was also rebuilt as an ABS car, but this car varied slightly by having low partitions separating the tables with fold down seats from these partitions. As the other ABS cars received workshop attention in the mid-1980s most also received this altered seating. In June 1989 RS 2301 was rebuilt as an 80-seat interurban car with no toilet to operate on the South Coast Daylight Express in company with 1100/1200 class carriages and recoded BKS.

PHS Power Vans
Nine cars provided the power for the air-conditioning, lighting and kitchen equipment. They were numbered 2290 to 2298 and coded PHS. They were fitted with an engine compartment that was originally fitted with two GM 6.71  diesel alternator units.

During the 1960s the GM diesels were replaced with higher powered Caterpillar D343 generator sets on cars 2293 to 2298. These new engines required the extension of the engine compartment, which then required the moving of the guard's compartment. This reduced the size of the luggage compartment, which was reduced to 3 tonnes capacity.

In 1982 PHS 2294 and 2296 were rebuilt with a toilet fitted in the luggage compartment area, the guard's compartment was fitted with air conditioning at the same time. The exterior sliding doors to the luggage compartment were relocated as well. These two cars were later further rebuilt with a shower and new toilet facilities in the luggage area.

In 1986 PHS 2296 was repowered with Cummins NT855 engines.

Surviving RUB carriages

Gallery

References

Railway coaches of New South Wales